Wilhelm Anton Kaulbach (8 August 1864, Hanover - 23 April 1934, Berlin) was a German portrait painter.

Biography 
He was born to the painter, Friedrich Kaulbach, and his third wife, Marie, née Wellhausen. His sister, and his half-brothers, Friedrich August and Sigmund (1854–1894) were also painters. He became deaf while still a small child, and attended a special deaf-mute school in Hildesheim. He was there for nine years, living with foster parents.

His first lessons in art came from his father. In 1882, Friedrich August brought him to Munich, where he studied at the Academy of Fine Arts. In 1883, he joined a group for the hearing impaired, the "Monachia Gruß". In 1888 he had his first showing at a major venue; displaying his painting "Two Chess Players" at an exhibition in the Glaspalast. He would later focus on portraits, but continued to produce the occasional genre painting.

From 1895 to 1900, he lived in Hamburg. In 1898, he married Eva Bohl (1878-1953), from Grabow, who would serve as a model for many of his paintings. They had three children. Their daughter, Gisela, would become a sort of conservator for his works, and helped identify many whose authorship was in question.

Monacensia Gebärdende Historie (Mohegis).</ref>

References

 Further reading 
 Friedrich von Boetticher: Malerwerke des 19. Jahrhunderts, Beitrag zur Kunstgeschichte, Band 1, 1891, S. 654 (Online) 
 E. S. Mittler (Ed.): Anton Kaulbach. Der letzte einer großen Malerfamilie. Berlin 1930
 Joachim Busse: Internationales Handbuch aller Maler und Bildhauer des 19. Jahrhunderts. Wiesbaden 1977, pg.659
 Evelyn Lehmann, Elke Riemer: Die Kaulbachs. Eine Künstlerfamilie aus Arolsen.'' Arolsen: Waldeckischer Geschichtsverein 1978

External links 

 More works by Kaulbach @ ArtNet
 Anton Kaulbach @ Mageda (databank)

1864 births
1934 deaths
19th-century German painters
19th-century German male artists
German portrait painters
Academy of Fine Arts, Munich alumni
Deaf artists
Artists from Hanover
Von Kaulbach family
20th-century German painters
20th-century German male artists